Calocheiridius elegans is a species of pseudoscorpion in the genus  Calocheiridius. It is found in India.

References 

 Olpiidae at Texas A&M University

Olpiidae
Animals described in 1977
Arthropods of India